WLTX (channel 19) is a television station in Columbia, South Carolina, United States, affiliated with CBS. Owned by Tegna Inc., the station maintains studios on Garners Ferry Road (US 76–378) in southeastern Columbia, and its transmitter is located on Screaming Eagle Road (southeast of I-20) in rural northeast Richland County.

History

WNOK-TV
The station first signed on the air on September 1, 1953, as WNOK-TV, originally broadcasting on UHF channel 67. It is the second oldest continuously operating television station in South Carolina, having signed on two months before WIS-TV (channel 10). The station has always been a CBS affiliate, but carried a secondary affiliation with the DuMont Television Network until 1955, one year before that network ceased operations.

The station originally maintained studio facilities located in the Jefferson Hotel in downtown Columbia, where it was based alongside sister radio property WNOK (1230 AM, later WPCO, and WNOK-FM 104.7). On June 30, 1961, the station switched channel positions, moving to UHF channel 19. In 1977, the station was sold to Lewis Broadcasting and changed its call letters to WLTX.

Signal upgrade
Historically, channel 19 was well behind long-dominant WIS in the ratings, especially in news programming. This was partly because the station was hampered by a weak signal. Although channel 19 decently covered Columbia itself as well as Lexington and Sumter counties, it was practically unviewable in the outlying areas of the market. This was due in part to being on UHF while WIS-TV was on VHF. In analog days, VHF signals carried farther than UHF signals. But WLTX's power and tower height were also lacking.

Until cable television arrived in the Columbia market in the 1970s, viewers looking for CBS programs in the outlying regions of the market had to rely on grade B signals from WRDW-TV (channel 12) in Augusta, Georgia or WBTV (channel 3) in Charlotte, North Carolina. However, in 1985, WLTX activated a new tall transmission tower in Lugoff that nearly doubled the station's signal and expanded its over-the-air coverage to 24 counties.

Secondary UPN affiliation

In January 1995, WLTX became a charter affiliate of the United Paramount Network (UPN); it carried the network's programming on a secondary basis during weekend afternoon timeslots when CBS had only limited sports programming (namely PGA Tour golf, tennis, NASCAR auto racing, and an expanded college basketball schedule).

The station dropped UPN programming after Sumter-licensed WQHB (channel 63, now MyNetworkTV affiliate WKTC) signed on in September 1997.

Gannett ownership
In 1998, Lewis Broadcasting sold WLTX to the Gannett Company. Gannett invested heavily in WLTX, doubling the size of the station in 2001 and providing the staff with all new news gathering equipment.

Soon after taking control, Gannett hired longtime WIS meteorologist Jim Gandy to serve as the station's chief meteorologist. However, since Gandy was initially prohibited from appearing on the station's newscasts until a one-year non-compete clause in his WIS contract expired, Gannett used him as a consultant at WLTX and to serve as a substitute meteorologist at the company's other stations, including WXIA-TV in Atlanta and WUSA-TV in Washington, D.C. In 2002, WLTX became the flagship broadcaster of the South Carolina Education Lottery.

Digital broadcasting
In May 2002, the station was the first commercial station in Columbia to broadcast in digital. WLTX's broadcasts became digital-only, effective June 12, 2009. Viewers who receive the over-the-air signal continue to see it as channel 19, although the digital transmission is on channel 15.

Dispute with Dish Network
In October 2012, Gannett entered a dispute against Dish Network regarding compensation fees and Dish's AutoHop commercial-skip feature on its Hopper digital video recorders. Gannett ordered that Dish discontinue AutoHop on the account that it is affecting advertising revenues for WLTX. Gannett threatened to pull all of its stations (such as WLTX) should the skirmish continue beyond October 7 and Dish and Gannett fail to reach an agreement. The two parties eventually reached an agreement after extending the deadline for a few hours.

On June 29, 2015, the Gannett Company split in two, with one side specializing in print media and the other side specializing in broadcast and digital media. WLTX was retained by the latter company, named Tegna.

Programming
WLTX clears the entire CBS schedule, but airs the CBS Dream Team block two hours earlier (although the third hour of the block is aired by the station on Sunday mornings) and CBS Saturday Morning two hours later than most CBS stations in the time zone. Syndicated programs broadcast by WLTX include 25 Words or Less, The Jennifer Hudson Show and Inside Edition.

News operation
WLTX presently broadcasts 30½ hours of locally produced newscasts each week (with 5½ hours on weekdays, two hours on Saturdays and one hour on Sundays).

For most of its history, WLTX has been a solid, if usually distant, runner-up to WIS. Indeed, for a time in the 1980s, WLTX didn't air a newscast at 11 p.m., even after activating its new tower. However, in recent years, WLTX has taken the lead at noon due to having CBS Daytime as a lead-in, and has frequently traded the lead in the early morning timeslot with WIS.

During the early 1990s, WLTX launched a weekly news segment titled "News 19: Player of the Week," which recognized the accomplishments of high school student athletes in the classroom and in their sport. Future NBA star Ray Allen won the award several times while playing at Hillcrest High School (now Hillcrest Middle School) in Dalzell. After being acquired by Gannett, the station also debuted feature segments for its newscast such as "On Your Side", "Restaurant Report Card" and "Big Money Monday."

In 2001, WLTX premiered a half-hour 7:00 p.m. newscast. WLTX's popular morning anchor team of J. R. Berry and Darci Strickland were promoted to anchoring the evening newscasts that year. During the May 2007 ratings period, WLTX's midday newscast continued to place at #1 in the noon timeslot (traditionally having the same lead-in since 1979), while it also won first on weekday mornings during the 5:00 a.m. half-hour. On August 20, 2007, WLTX debuted an hour-long 5:00 p.m. newscast titled News 19: Friends @ Five; the program won a Southeast Regional Emmy Award on June 23, 2008, for its innovative approach to connecting with viewers. The station's 11:00 p.m. newscast also won an Emmy Award for "Best Newscast" for the second year in a row. On June 26, 2010, the station's 6:00 p.m. newscast took home an Emmy Award for "Best Newscast."

On January 24, 2011, WLTX became the third television station in the Columbia market to begin broadcasting its local newscasts in high definition. In July 2013, WLTX became the second station in Columbia to expand its weekday morning newscast into the 4:30 a.m. timeslot; later on October 5, 2013, WLTX premiered an hour-long Saturday morning newscast at 11:00 a.m., becoming the second station in Columbia to air a morning news program on weekends (after WIS).

On January 20, 2015, WLTX was awarded the prestigious Alfred I. duPont Award for its series of over 40 reports on the dysfunction of South Carolina's Department of Social Services.

Subchannels
The station's digital signal is multiplexed:

WLTX carries The Justice Network on 19.2 and carries a 24/7 weather channel, which used to be called News 19 Weather NOW, under its affiliation with The Local AccuWeather Channel from 2005 until 2013, when it changed affiliations to WeatherNation TV and was renamed to News 19 WeatherNation.

The station has been able to take advantage of multi-casting and high-definition broadcast technology to air various special events, including the Super Bowl and the NCAA men's basketball tournament. In fact, WLTX was one of the few stations in the United States to use digital technology to broadcast all games of March Madness using all digital channels.

Notable former on-air staff
 Matt Barrie (now at ESPN)
 Joel Connable (deceased)
 Natasha Curry (now at HLN)
 Ainsley Earhardt (now at Fox News Channel)

References

External links

Tegna Inc.
CBS network affiliates
True Crime Network affiliates
Decades (TV network) affiliates
Quest (American TV network) affiliates
Twist (TV network) affiliates
This TV affiliates
TheGrio affiliates
Television channels and stations established in 1953
1953 establishments in South Carolina
LTX
Former Gannett subsidiaries